Wasa Lake Provincial Park is a provincial park in southeastern British Columbia, Canada.

References

Provincial parks of British Columbia
Parks in the Regional District of East Kootenay